The 2014 Pan American Women's Junior Handball Championship took place in Buenos Aires from April 1–5. It acts as the Pan American qualifying tournament for the 2014 Women's Junior World Handball Championship.

Results

Final standing

Awards
All-star team
Goalkeeper:  Gabriela Gonçalves
Right Wing:  Martina Barreiro
Right Back:  Elke Karsten
Playmaker:  Alejandra Scarrone
Left Back:  Ana Acuña
Left Wing:  Bruna Gonçalves
Pivot:  Tamires Lima
Best Player  Alejandra Scarrone

References 
 brasilhandebol.com.br

2014 in handball
2014
International handball competitions hosted by Argentina
2014
2014 in Argentine women's sport